Terekhovo is a rural locality (a selo) in Starooskolsky District, Belgorod Oblast, Russia. The population was 434 as of 2010. There are 15 streets.

Geography 
Terekhovo is located 21 km northeast of Stary Oskol (the district's administrative centre) by road. Kotovo is the nearest rural locality.

References 

Rural localities in Starooskolsky District